Stunt Racer 64 is a racing video game for the Nintendo 64, developed by Boss Studios, and published by Midway for a North American release in 2000.

Gameplay
Set in some unspecified time in the future, vehicles are retrofitted with futuristic engine and turbo technology, in addition to jets mounted to allow the car to perform midair stunts. These stunts, including flips, barrel rolls, etc., allow the player to accumulate cash rewards during races on levitating tracks. Money accumulated is used to purchase new cars, as well as upgraded parts for cars.

Modes
Contest Mode - One player selects one of four characters, each with their own unique cars. From there, players compete in races against a full tournament consisting of dozens of AI-controlled opponents. Although the character biographies hint that the computer characters have distinct racing personalities, there is no direct interaction with them and they serve no purpose whatsoever in gameplay. For each heat, a certain number of points is awarded for each place. The player must place high enough overall in each round to advance. Placing first in a race allows the player to keep all money earned, second place allows half of the money earned to be kept, and no money is kept for places 3–6. There are five leagues to race through, each bringing an increasing level of difficulty, more opponents with better vehicles, more rounds, and more tracks. When a first-place overall finish is attained, the player races one-on-one against the league owner, with the prize of the league owner's car. The leagues are, in order of increasing difficulty:
Kid Cola's League
Bunny's League
Hill Bully's League
Big John's League
Dr. Death's League
(Note: The player has to play the game on the Normal or Hard difficulty in order to access Dr. Death's league.)
Replay is available to view after every race in contest mode.

Quick Race - One to four players can compete in an arcade-style race where the cash prizes do not accumulate above $1,000 (When a player reaches $1,000+, each $1,000 is automatically traded for a Turbo that they can use to at any time to go faster.) The cars available (and their upgrade status) depends upon the game save last loaded in Contest Mode. The two main modes of the Quick Race are Single Race (with optional computer opponents) and Practice (with no computer opponents). The two stunt tracks, Half Pipe, and Stunt Bowl, are open only in Quick Race. Replay is not available to view after every race in quick race mode, with the exception of Stunt Bowl and Half Pipe.

Cars 
When a career is first started in Contest Mode, the player selects one of four starter characters, each with their own car: Warbird Light, Z-Bucket, Stottlemeyer, and Del Raye. Cash prizes can later be used to purchase the rest of these starter cars if desired, along with other cars that are available by purchase only. Among these aforementioned cars, once they reach full upgrade, a fancier version of the car comes up for sale. These "upgraded" cars cannot have their parts upgraded. Neither can the cars earned from league owners.

Cancellation 
Stunt Racer 64 was cancelled in Europe in October 2000.

Reception

References

2000 video games
Nintendo 64 games
Nintendo 64-only games
North America-exclusive video games
Racing video games
Video games developed in the United States